Proteracacinidins are polymeric condensed tannins composed of mesquitol. This type of tannin can be found in Acacia caffra (Senegalia caffra).

The oxydative depolymerisation of proteracacinidins yields the anthocyanidin teracacinidin.

References 

Condensed tannins
Senegalia